Robert Dunsire  (24 November 1891 – 30 January 1916) was a Scottish recipient of the Victoria Cross, the highest and most prestigious award for gallantry in the face of the enemy that can be awarded to British and Commonwealth forces.

Dunsire was born in November 1891 to Thomas and Elizabeth Anderson Dunsire at Buckhaven in Fife. At the outbreak of war in 1914, Robert was a miner at the Fife Coal Company's Rosie Pit and married to Catherine Pitt. He enlisted in January 1915 joining the 13th Battalion, The Royal Scots (The Lothian Regiment), British Army. It was during the First World War when the following deed took place for which he was awarded the VC for his actions during the Battle of Loos, on 26 September 1915.

Citation

He later achieved the rank of corporal.  He was killed in action at Mazingarbe in France on 30 January 1916 and is buried there.

His Victoria Cross is displayed at the Royal Scots Museum, Edinburgh Castle, Scotland.

References

 François Caron, Robert Dunsire : une Victoria Cross à Mazingarbe, bulletin du Comité Historique de Mazingarbe, n° 39, Mazingarbe, juin 2012.
 Methil Heritage

Further reading
 Monuments to Courage (David Harvey, 1999)
 The Register of the Victoria Cross (This England, 1997)
 Scotland's Forgotten Valour (Graham Ross, 1995)
 VCs of the First World War – The Western Front 1915 (Peter F. Batchelor & Christopher Matson, 1999)

External links
 

1891 births
1916 deaths
British Army personnel of World War I
British World War I recipients of the Victoria Cross
Royal Scots soldiers
British military personnel killed in World War I
People from Buckhaven
British Army recipients of the Victoria Cross
Military personnel from Fife